Grąbczewo  is a settlement in the administrative district of Gmina Brzeżno in Świdwin County, West Pomeranian Voivodeship, northwestern Poland.

For the region's history, see History of Pomerania.

References

Villages in Świdwin County